Acrobasis caliginella is a species of snout moth in the genus Acrobasis. It was described by George Duryea Hulst in 1878. It is found in the US states of California and Arizona.

Quercus agrifolia, Quercus wizlizenii, Quercus dumosa, Quercus durata and Quercus vaccinifolia.

References

Moths described in 1878
Acrobasis
Moths of North America